2,5-Diphenyloxazole (PPO) is an organic scintillator. It is used as a wavelength shifter (also called a "primary shifter" or "fluor"), which means that it converts shorter wavelength light to longer wavelength light. Its output spectrum peaks at 385 nm, which is in the range of UV light.

References 

Oxazoles